= Jiwachhpur =

Jiwachhpur is a village in Supaul district, Bihar, India, with agriculture being the main profession.
